Club Sport Norte América, known as Norte América or Norteamérica, is an Ecuadorian football club based in Guayaquil. Founded in 1916, it plays in the Segunda Categoría, the country's third division.

Well-known for its successful youth setup, Norte América played three seasons in Serie A (1966, 1969 and 1971) aside from one Serie B in 1971.

Honours 
Segunda Categoría (Guayas) (5): 1968, 1970, 1970, 1980, 1989, 2015

References

External links
Federación Ecuatoriana de Fútbol profile 

Football clubs in Ecuador
Association football clubs established in 1916
1916 establishments in Ecuador